Harold Suydam Brewster (May 2, 1903 – September 3, 1994) was an American field hockey player who competed in the 1932 Summer Olympics.

In 1932 he was a member of the American field hockey team, which won the bronze medal. He played two matches as goalkeeper. 33 goals was scored against him.

He was born in Lakewood, New Jersey.

External links
 
profile

1903 births
1994 deaths
American male field hockey players
Field hockey players at the 1932 Summer Olympics
Olympic bronze medalists for the United States in field hockey
Medalists at the 1932 Summer Olympics
20th-century American people